The United States Veterans' Affairs Subcommittee on Oversight and Investigations is one of the four subcommittees within the House Veterans' Affairs Committee.

Jurisdiction
The Subcommittee on Oversight and Investigations reviews the benefits and the health care services that the federal government provides to eligible veterans and family members. It also oversees the programs and operations of the Department of Veterans Affairs, as well as those of other federal agencies that pertain to veterans. In carrying out its responsibilities, the subcommittee conducts hearings, site visits and investigations nationwide. It also requests reports from the General Accounting Office, the Congressional Research Service and the VA's Office of the Inspector General. The subcommittee only has jurisdiction over such bills and resolutions as may be referred to it by the chairman of the full committee.

Members, 117th Congress

Historical membership rosters

115th Congress

116th Congress

External links
Subcommittee page

Veterans' Affairs Oversight